

Launch history

1986-1992 

When the H–1 was announced in 1986, company representative Tsuguo Tatakawe clarified that it would only be used to launch indigenous (i.e. Japanese) payloads, that only two launches per year could be mounted, and that the launch window consisted of a four-month period in which Japanese fishing fleets were not active (the falling launch boosters may damage fishing nets in the ocean waters).

References

JAXA
JAXA
Rocket launches